The Calumet Aristocrats were a minor league baseball team based in Laurium, Michigan from 1904 to 1907. The city was called "Calumet" in the era. The Calumet Red Jackets preceded the Aristocrats, playing in 1890 and 1891. The Calumet teams played as members of the Upper Peninsula League in 1890 and 1891, Copper Country Soo League in 1904 and 1905 and Northern-Copper Country League in 1906 and 1907, hosting minor league home games at Athletic Park. Calumet won league championships in 1891 and 1906.

History
Calumet, Michigan began minor league play in 1890. Calumet hosted the Calumet Red Jackets team in the Independent level Upper Peninsula League. In their first season of play, the Red Jackets finished with a record of 13–20 to place 4th, playing under manager Jack Halpin. Houghton ended the season with a 23-12 record to win the championship, finishing 4.0 games ahead of the 2nd place Ishpeming team, who were followed by the Marquette Undertakers and Calumet Red Jackets. The Hancock and Negaunee teams both folded before the season had concluded.

The Calumet use of the "Red Jackets" moniker corresponds to the city of Calumet originally being named "Red Jacket," beginning in 1864. Until 1895, the current town of Laurium, Michigan was named Calumet.

In 1891, the Calumet Red Jackets won the Upper Peninsula League championship. With a final record of 36–24, the Red Jackets finished 5.0 games ahead of the 2nd place Marquette Undertakers in final standings of the four–team league. Jack Halpin again managed Calumet, who also finished ahead of the 3rd place Ishpeming and 4th place Houghton teams.

After playing in the 1904 Copper County League with no records known, in 1905, the Calumet Aristorcrats won the pennant playing in a new league. Playing as members of the four–team Class D level Copper Country Soo League, Calumet finished the season with a record of 61–36 to finish in 1st place. Playing under manager Charles Fitchel, the Aristocrats finished 2.0 games ahead of the 2nd place Lake Linden Lakers. In the playoff, Lake Linden swept Calumet in four games.

In 1906, the Calumet Aristocrats became charter members of the eight–team Class C level Northern-Copper Country League.

In their first season of play in the new league, the 1906 Calumet Aristocrats won the Northern-Copper Country League championship. Beginning play on May 17, 1906, the 1st place Calumet Aristocrats  finished the season with a final record of 61–37), playing under manager G.W. Orr. The Aristocrats finished ahead of Houghton Giants (56–65), Winnipeg Maroons (57–38), Duluth White Sox (52–44), Lake Linden Sandy Lakes (40–56) and Fargo Trolley Dodgers (35–59) in the final standings. The Hancock Infants (29–34) and Grand Forks Forkers (13–40) teams folded during the season.

The Calumet Aristocrats played their final season in 1907. The 1907 Northern-Copper Country League played as a four–team Class D level league. Beginning play on May 14, 1907, the Houghton Giants placed 4th in the 1907 the Northern-Copper Country League standings, when the season ended early on September 2, 1907. Houghton ended the 1907 season with a 47–55 record, playing under managers M.O. Taylor and Pat Flaherty. The Giants finished 25.5 games behind the 1st place Winnipeg Maroons (70–27), 2nd place Duluth White Sox (49–53) and ahead of the 4th place Calumet Aristocrats (34–65) in the final standings.

The Northern-Copper Country League permanently folded after the 1907 season. Laurium, Michigan has not hosted another minor league team.

The ballparks
For the duration of their minor league play, Calumet teams played home games at Athletic Park. The park was later renamed Agassiz Park. The ballpark was referenced to have been located at 4th Street & Elm Street. Today, Agassiz Park is still in use as a public park.

In 1890, 1891 and 1905, the Calumet teams were noted to have hosted some home minor league games at Laurium Park. The ballpark was referenced to have been located on 3rd Street at the Railroad Tracks, Laurium, Michigan.

Timeline

Year–by–year records

Notable alumni

Dad Clarke (1905)
Biddy Dolan (1906–1907)
Ed Kippert (1906)
Tom Leahy (1906)
Doc Miller (1906)
Pat Paige (1905)
Bert Sincock (1907)
Hosea Siner (1906)

References

External links
Baseball Reference

Defunct minor league baseball teams
Defunct baseball teams in Michigan
Baseball teams established in 1904
Baseball teams disestablished in 1907
Houghton County, Michigan